Estadio Héroes de San Ramón is a multi-use stadium in Cajamarca (northern Andes), Peru. It is currently used by football team Club Universidad Técnica de Cajamarca. The stadium seats 18,000 people. 
The origin of its name comes from the battle of San Pablo, where three students from San Ramón de Cajamarca School died for Perú, in the War of the Pacific. This stadium is undergoing improvements by the Peruvian Institute for Sport.

Heroes de San Ramon
Buildings and structures in Cajamarca Region